Sutton railway station (sometimes referred to as Sutton (Surrey) on tickets and timetables) is in the London Borough of Sutton in South London and is the main station serving the town of Sutton.

History 

Sutton station was opened by the London, Brighton and South Coast Railway (LB&SCR) on 10 May 1847, when the railway opened its line from West Croydon to Epsom. A branch to Epsom Downs was opened on 22 May 1865, followed by a line to Mitcham Junction on 1 October 1868. The final change to the station came when the branch to Wimbledon opened on 5 January 1930.

Until the early 1980s, it was possible to catch a direct express train to the coast from Sutton to Bognor Regis, Chichester or Portsmouth. Since the mid-1980s, these express services have been routed via East Croydon in order to serve Gatwick Airport; passengers from Sutton for the south coast now have to change at Horsham, or alternatively travel to West Croydon station and walk, take the bus or use Croydon's Tramlink service to reach East Croydon station.

Layout 
The four platforms at Sutton station are numbered 1 to 4 from north to south. Platforms 1 and 2 are on the lines to Wimbledon, Epsom, Leatherhead, Dorking, and Horsham. Platforms 1 and 3 are used by services from outer termini to Central London. Trains from Central London use platforms 2 and 4. Terminating trains which return to central London generally use platform 4.

Nowadays all trains calling at Sutton are formed of ten coaches or fewer. At the London end of platform 1, there are the remains of a fifth platform, which was a bay for local services via Mitcham Junction.

Two waiting rooms serve the station. An M&S Food to Go shop sits adjacent to the concourse within the station building.

Three lifts serve all platforms – one each for platforms one, two/three and four.

The installation of a side entrance serving the Quadrant was completed in summer 2014.

Wimbledon branch 
Parliamentary approval for a line from Wimbledon to Sutton had been obtained by the Wimbledon and Sutton Railway (W&SR) in 1910, but work had been delayed by the First World War. From the W&SR's inception, the District Railway (DR, now the District line) was a shareholder of the company and had rights to run trains over the line when built. In the 1920s, the Underground Electric Railways Company of London (UERL, precursor of London Underground) planned, through its ownership of the DR, to use part of the route for an extension of the City and South London Railway (C&SLR, now the Northern line) to Sutton.

The SR objected and an agreement was reached that enabled the C&SLR to extend as far as Morden in exchange for the UERL giving up its rights over the W&SR route. The SR subsequently built the line, one of the last to be built in the London area. In both the 1910 and 1920s proposals, the next station towards Wimbledon was to be Cheam on Cheam Road, but the SR dropped this station and replaced it with West Sutton station. The line opened on 5 January 1930 when full services on the line were extended from South Merton.

Services 
Services at Sutton are operated by Southern and Thameslink using  and  EMUs.

The typical off-peak service in trains per hour is:
 2 tph to 
 2 tph to 

During the peak hours, the station is served by an additional half-hourly service to London Victoria via Norbury and via Hackbridge.

On Saturday evenings (after approximately 18:45) and on Sundays, there is no service south of Dorking to Horsham.

Connections 
London Buses routes 80, 164, 280, 470, S1, S3 and S4, night route N44 and non-TFL route 420 serve the station.

Future 
A planned extension to the Tramlink light rail or a separate bus rapid transit (BRT) system called the Sutton Link will create a new tram or BRT/rail interchange in Sutton, offering services to South Wimbledon via St Helier.

References

External links 

Railway stations in the London Borough of Sutton
Former London, Brighton and South Coast Railway stations
Railway stations in Great Britain opened in 1847
Railway stations served by Govia Thameslink Railway
Proposed London Underground stations
Railway station
1847 establishments in England